The New Beginning in Sapporo (2018) was a professional wrestling event promoted by New Japan Pro-Wrestling (NJPW). The event took place on January 27 and 28, 2018, in Sapporo, Hokkaido, at the Hokkaido Prefectural Sports Center. The first night of the event featured nine matches, two of which were contested for championships, while the second night featured two championship matches out of nine matches overall. In the main event of the first night, Minoru Suzuki defeated Hiroshi Tanahashi to become the new IWGP Intercontinental Champion, and on the second night Jay White defeated Kenny Omega to become the new IWGP United States Heavyweight Champion. This was the thirteenth event under the New Beginning name and the second to take place in Sapporo.

Production

Background
In recent years, NJPW has held the opening day of the G1 Climax tournament in Sapporo. With The New Beginning in Sapporo, the promotion revived an old tradition of holding a show during the annual Sapporo Snow Festival, resulting in the show being promoted under the subtitle . The event aired worldwide on NJPW's internet streaming site, NJPW World, with English commentary provided by Kevin Kelly and Don Callis, the latter of whom replaced Kelly's previous broadcast partner Steve Corino.

Storylines
The New Beginning in Sapporo featured nine professional wrestling matches for each night, which involved different wrestlers from pre-existing scripted feuds and storylines. Wrestlers portrayed villains, heroes, or less distinguishable characters in the scripted events that built tension and culminated in a wrestling match or series of matches.

At New Year’s Dash Kenny Omega tried to bring “Switchblade” Jay White into the Bullet Club. White seemingly accepted the offer but rejected it hitting Omega with “Blade Runner”. The next day White joined Chaos and a match between the two was made with the IWGP United States Heavyweight Championship on the line.

Results

Night 1

Night 2

References

External links
The New Beginning at NJPW.co.jp

2017.1
2018 in professional wrestling
January 2018 events in Japan
Events in Sapporo
Professional wrestling in Japan